Henry F. Wilke (February 5, 1857 – May 9, 1931) was an American businessman and politician.

Born in Phenegge, Waldeck, Germany, Wilke was educated in Germany. In 1889, Wilke emigrated to the United States and settled in Madison, Wisconsin. He was in the general merchandise and lumber business. He then moved to Blue Mounds, Wisconsin. Finally. Wilke settled in Verona, Wisconsin. He served as postmaster for Verona, Wisconsin. In 1895, Wilke served in the Wisconsin State Assembly and was a Republican. Wilke died in 1931 and was buried at Forest Hill Cemetery in Madison.

Notes

External links

1857 births
1931 deaths
German emigrants to the United States
People from Blue Mounds, Wisconsin
Businesspeople from Wisconsin
Republican Party members of the Wisconsin State Assembly
Wisconsin postmasters
Burials in Wisconsin
People from Madison, Wisconsin
People from Verona, Wisconsin
People from Waldeck-Frankenberg